Franz Ritter von Stuck (February 23, 1863 – August 30, 1928), born Franz Stuck, was a German painter, sculptor, printmaker, and architect. Stuck was best known for his paintings of ancient mythology, receiving substantial critical acclaim with The Sin in 1892. In 1906, Stuck was awarded the Order of Merit of the Bavarian Crown and was henceforth known as Ritter von Stuck.

Life and career

Born at Tettenweis near Passau, Stuck displayed an affinity for drawing and caricature from an early age. To begin his artistic education he relocated in 1878 to Munich, where he would settle for life. From 1881 to 1885 Stuck attended the Munich Academy.

He first became well known by cartoons for Fliegende Blätter, and vignette designs for programmes and book decoration. In 1889 he exhibited his first paintings at the Munich Glass Palace, winning a gold medal for The Guardian of Paradise.

In 1892 Stuck co-founded the Munich Secession, and also executed his first sculpture, Athlete. The next year he won further acclaim with the critical and public success of what is now his best known work, the painting The Sin. Also during 1893, Stuck was awarded a gold medal for painting at the World's Columbian Exposition in Chicago, and was appointed to a royal professorship. In 1895, he began teaching painting at the Munich Academy.

In 1897 Stuck married an American widow, Mary Lindpainter, and began work designing his own residence and studio, the Villa Stuck. His designs for the villa included everything from layout to interior decorations; for his furniture Stuck received another gold medal at the 1900 Paris World Exposition.

Having attained a high public profile by this time, Stuck was ennobled on December 9, 1905, and would receive further public honours from around Europe during the remainder of his life. He continued to be well respected among young artists as professor at the Munich Academy, even after his artistic styles became unfashionable. His students over the years included Paul Klee, Hans Purrmann, Wassily Kandinsky, Alf Bayrle and Josef Albers.

He was a member of the International Society of Sculptors, Painters and Gravers. His work was also part of the sculpture event in the art competition at the 1928 Summer Olympics.

Franz von Stuck died on August 30, 1928, in Munich; his funeral address memorialized him as "the last prince of art of Munich's great days". He is buried in the Munich Waldfriedhof next to his wife Mary.

Style
Stuck's subject matter was primarily from mythology, inspired by the work of Arnold Böcklin. Large forms dominate most of his paintings and indicate his proclivities for sculpture. His seductive female nudes are a prime example of popular Symbolist content. Stuck paid much attention to the frames for his paintings and generally designed them himself with such careful use of panels, gilt carving and inscriptions that the frames must be considered as an integral part of the overall piece.

Ritter von Stuck's Kämpfende Amazone (Fighting Amazon), created in 1897, graced Hermann Göring's Carinhall.

Legacy
By the time of his death, Stuck's importance as an artist in his own right had almost been forgotten: his art seemed old-fashioned and irrelevant to a generation that had endured World War I.  Stuck's reputation languished until the late 1960s when a renewed interest in Art Nouveau brought him to attention once more. In 1968 the Villa Stuck was opened to the public; it is now a museum.

In Robert Waite's 1977 book The Psychopathic God: Adolf Hitler and numerous other sources it is noted that Franz Stuck was Hitler's favorite painter from childhood on.

Stuck's paintings were mentioned by Carl Jung, who wrote:

Gallery

See also
Art nouveau
Symbolism (arts)

References

Bibliography
 Adam, Peter. Art of the Third Reich. New York City: Harry N. Abrams. 1992. .
 Gibson, Michael. Symbolism. Köln: Benedikit Taschen Verlag. 1995. .
 Mendgen, Eva. Von Stuck. Köln: Benedikt Taschen Verlag. 1995. .

External links

 Collection of Works by Franz von Stuck
 Museum Villa Stuck (in German)
 The Gallery of Franz von Stuck
 Franz von Stuck: Living Images
 Grave of Mary and Franz von Stuck

1863 births
1928 deaths
People from Passau (district)
Bavarian nobility
19th-century German painters
19th-century German male artists
German male painters
20th-century German painters
20th-century German male artists
German Symbolist painters
Academic staff of the Academy of Fine Arts, Munich
Academy of Fine Arts, Munich alumni
Art Nouveau painters
Art Nouveau sculptors
Art Nouveau architects
Symbolist sculptors
Burials at Munich Waldfriedhof
20th-century sculptors
19th-century sculptors
Members of the Vienna Secession
Olympic competitors in art competitions